The Walton School of Auctioneering is an auction school in Medina, Ohio, United States.

History 
The Walton School of Auctioneering was opened in 1989 and is a subsidiary of Walton & Associates Inc. Walton is the oldest operating auction school in Ohio, and focuses on teaching the business of auctioneering. The school emphasizes the basics of education as required by state licensing agencies as well as information on starting out in the business. Class sizes are limited to 20 students per class to allow instructors to focus on the students.  The Walton School of Auctioneering is Ohio's largest auction school, with over 800 graduates. The Walton School of Auctioneering is headquartered in Medina, Ohio (approximately 33 miles south of Cleveland and 23 miles west of Akron).

Curriculum 
The Walton School of Auctioneering curriculum is structured to meet state licensing requirements and help students get off to a fast start in the profession by teaching basic skills in the following 14 areas:
 Bid calling (auction chant) and voice control
 History of auctions
 Federal and state laws regulating the auction profession
 Getting started as an auctioneer
 Consignment auctions and auction galleries
 Auctions of antiques and furniture
 Marketing, advertising and promoting the auction and public relations
 Farm equipment and livestock auctions
 Real estate auctions
 Auto auctions (both dealer and public)
 Industrial plant and large equipment auctions
 Exams and reviews
 Estate and bankruptcy auctions
 Federal firearms auction laws

Terms are held quarterly, typically in February, June, September, and December. Students have attended the school from 17 states and three countries. Some have won top bid calling honors in state competitions or work on highly regarded television programs such as Antiques Roadshow and History Detectives.

Continuing education 
The Walton School of Auctioneering provides continuing education classes for auctioneers. All graduates receive free lifetime scholarships to attend any portion or all sessions in any future class. Many graduate apprentices prepare for their upcoming state auctioneers exams by revisiting the law review portion of class prior to sitting for their exams.

References

External links 
Walton School of Auctioneering
Walton and Associates

Auction schools
Vocational schools in Ohio